August 2015 Kabul attacks may refer to:

7 August 2015 Kabul attacks
10 August 2015 Kabul suicide bombing
22 August 2015 Kabul suicide bombing